Adamastor is a mythological character created by the Portuguese poet Luís de Camões in his epic poem Os Lusíadas (first printed in 1572), as a personification of the Cape of Good Hope, symbolizing the dangers of the sea and the formidable forces of nature challenged and ultimately overcome by the Portuguese during the Discovery Age. Adamastor manifests itself out of a storm.

Background
Camões gave his creation a backstory as one of the Giants of Greek mythology, banished to the Cape of Good Hope by sea goddess Doris for falling in love with her daughter Tethis, now appearing out of a storm cloud and threatening to ruin anyone hardy enough to attempt passing the Cape and penetrate the Indian Ocean, which was Adamastor's domain. Adamastor became the spirit of the Cape of Good Hope, a hideous phantom of unearthly pallor:

Vasco da Gama, ahead of the Portuguese expedition, confronts the creature by asking "Who are you?", prompting Adamastor to tell his story. 

Deeply moved, the giant eventually vanishes, dispersing the clouds and calming the sea, leaving the path towards India open.

Adamastor represented the dangers Portuguese sailors faced when trying to round the Cape of Storms – Cabo das Tormentas – henceforth called the Cape of Good Hope.

Legacy

A popular gathering place in Lisbon is known by the name 'Adamastor' because of the large stone statue of the mythical figure which presides over the space, which is officially called the Miradouro de Santa Catarina.  The location offers visitors some of the most scenic views of the Tagus river, the 25 de Abril Bridge and the Cristo-Rei monument.

The Portuguese poet Fernando Pessoa included in his 1934 book Mensagem a number of verses dedicated to Adamastor, entitled O Mostrengo ("The Hideous Monster")

Adamastor, both the mythological character and the sculpture, are mentioned several times in José Saramago's Nobel Prize-winning novel, The Year of the Death of Ricardo Reis, and also in his historical novel Memorial do Convento (English language version: Baltasar and Blimunda).

Adamastor has figured in much poetry of the Cape. In The First Life of Adamastor, a novella by André Brink, the writer refashioned the Adamastor story from a 20th-century perspective.

Adamastor is also mentioned in the opera L'Africaine (1865) about Vasco da Gama by the composer Giacomo Meyerbeer. The slave Nelusko sings a song about Adamastor while he deliberately steers the ship into a storm and it sinks.

It is mentioned by Voltaire in his Essai sur la poésie épique. It also appears in the works of Victor Hugo: Les Misérables (III, Marius, chap III) and in a poem dedicated to Lamartine (Les Feuilles d'automne, chap IX). Alexandre Dumas, père refers the giant six times:  Le Comte de Monte Cristo (chap. XXXI), Vingt ans après (chap. LXXVII), Georges (chap. I), Bontekoe, Les drames de la mer, (chap. I), Causeries (chap. IX) and Mes Mémoires (chap. CCXVIII). Gaston Leroux also mentions it in The Phantom of the Opera (chap. VI). Herman Melville mentions Adamastor and Camões in his Billy Budd, at the end of Chapter VII.

Adamastor is also the name of a sauropod dinosaur, Angolatitan adamastor, found in Angola, named by the paleontologist Octávio Mateus.

Etymology
The name Adamastor is an adaptation for the Portuguese language from the Greek word for "Untamed" or "Untameable" (Adamastos) (which the Portuguese did tame).

References

External links

 Cyril Coetzee, "Myth of Adamastor revisited"
Ferreira, Ockert Jacobus Olivier (1940- ), "Adamastor, Spirit of the Cape of Storms"/  "Adamastor, Espírito do Cabo das Tormentas"/ "Adamastor, Gees van die Stormkaap"

Portuguese legendary creatures
Portuguese mythology
Portuguese culture
South African mythology
Fictional giants
Ancient Greece in art and culture